Cupey is a rapid transit station in San Juan agglomeration, Puerto Rico. It is located between Centro Médico and Río Piedras stations on the only line of the Tren Urbano system, in the El Cinco district of the city of San Juan. The station is named after the barrio of Cupey, located further south. The trial service ran in 2004, however, the regular service only started on 6 June 2005.

Nearby 
 Ana G. Méndez University, Universidad Metropolitana (UMET)
 Molecular Sciences Research Center
 Puerto Rico Department of Natural and Environmental Resources
 San Juan Botanical Garden (Botanical Garden of the University of Puerto Rico)
 Villa Nevárez Cemetery

Gallery

References

Tren Urbano stations
Railway stations in the United States opened in 2004
2004 establishments in Puerto Rico